The Satellite Award for Best Actor in a Motion Picture is an annual award given by the International Press Academy as one of its Satellite Awards. The category has gone through several changes since its inception. 
 From 1996 to 2010, two categories based on genre were presented, Best Actor – Motion Picture Drama and Best Actor – Motion Picture Comedy or Musical
 In 2011, the IPA pared down its Satellite nominations in the motion picture categories from 22 to 19 classifications; the change reflects the merger of drama and comedy under a general Best Picture heading, including the Best Actor/Actress headings and the Supporting headings.
 In 2016 and 2017, two winners were announced within the Best Actor category, one for the performance by an actor in a major studio film and other for a performance in an independent film.
Since 2018, the two categories based on genre are presented replacing the Best Actor in a Motion Picture category for the Best Actor – Motion Picture Drama and Best Actor – Motion Picture Comedy or Musical categories previously presented.

Winners and nominees

Best Actor – Motion Picture Drama (1996–2010, 2018–present)

Best Actor – Motion Picture Musical or Comedy (1996–2010, 2018–present)

Best Actor – Motion Picture (2011–2017)

Multiple nominations
8 nominations
 Leonardo DiCaprio

7 nominations
 Denzel Washington

6 nominations
 Ryan Gosling

5 nominations
 Johnny Depp

4 nominations
 Russell Crowe
 Daniel Day-Lewis
 Jake Gyllenhaal
 Sean Penn
 Viggo Mortensen
 Joaquin Phoenix

3 nominations
 Billy Bob Thornton
 Matt Damon
 Brendan Gleeson
 Edward Norton
 Tom Hanks
 Gary Oldman
 Eddie Murphy
 Bradley Cooper
 Steve Carell
 Bill Murray
 Mark Ruffalo
 Colin Firth
 Tommy Lee Jones
 Jack Nicholson
 George Clooney
 Christian Bale

2 nominations
 Geoffrey Rush
 Michael Caine
 Robert Redford
 Philip Seymour Hoffman
 Robin Williams
 Jeremy Renner
 Josh Brolin
 Frank Langella
 William H. Macy
 Kevin Kline
 Will Smith
 Richard Gere
 Sam Rockwell
 Adam Sandler
 Robert Duvall
 Lin-Manuel Miranda
 Andrew Garfield
 Jeff Bridges
 Forest Whitaker
 Tom Cruise
 Jim Carrey
 Benedict Cumberbatch
 James Franco
 Michael Douglas
 Javier Bardem
 Don Cheadle
 Eddie Redmayne
 Paul Giamatti
 Tom Hardy
 Michael Fassbender
 Robert Downey Jr.
 Sacha Baron Cohen
 Michael Cera

Multiple wins
2 wins
 Geoffrey Rush
 Viggo Mortensen
 Philip Seymour Hoffman
 Ryan Gosling
 Andrew Garfield

See also
 Academy Award for Best Actor
 Golden Globe Award for Best Actor – Motion Picture Musical or Comedy
 Golden Globe Award for Best Actor – Motion Picture Drama
 Critics' Choice Movie Award for Best Actor

References

External links
 Official website

Actor Motion Picture Musical or Comedy
Film awards for lead actor